This article comprises a list of measures of financial performance.

Return measures
 Arithmetic return: average return of different observation periods
 Geometric return: return depending only on start date and end date of one overall observation period
 Rate of return or return on investment
 Total shareholder return: annualized growth in capital assuming that dividends are reinvested

Risk measures
 Risk measure
 Distortion risk measure
 Tail conditional expectation
 Value at risk
 Convex risk measure
 Entropic risk measure
 Coherent risk measure
 Discounted maximum loss
 Expected shortfall
 Superhedging price
 Spectral risk measure
 Deviation risk measure
 Standard deviation or Variance
 Mid-range
 Interdecile range
 Interquartile range

Risk-adjusted performance measures

 Calmar ratio
 Coefficient of variation
 Information ratio
 Jaws ratio
 Jensen's alpha
 Modigliani risk-adjusted performance
 Roy's safety-first criterion
 Sharpe ratio
 Sortino ratio
 Sterling ratio
 Treynor ratio
 Upside potential ratio
 V2 ratio

Financial accounting
financial performance measures